Felipe Sassone (1884–1959) was a Peruvian writer of Italian origin, who lived most of his life in Spain.

1884 births
1959 deaths
Peruvian male writers
Peruvian emigrants to Spain